General elections were held in Italy on 18 April 1948 to elect the first Parliament of the Italian Republic.

After the Soviet-backed coup in Czechoslovakia in February 1948, the U.S. became alarmed about Soviet intentions in Central Europe. The U.S. feared that Italy would be drawn into the Soviet sphere of influence if the leftist Popular Democratic Front (Italian abbr.: FDP), which consisted of the Italian Communist Party (PCI) and the Italian Socialist Party (PSI), were to win the 1948 general election. As the last month of the election campaign began, Time magazine published an article which argued that an FDP victory would push Italy to "the brink of catastrophe". The U.S. consequently intervened in the election by heavily funding the centrist coalition led by Christian Democracy (DC) and launching an anti-communist propaganda campaign in Italy. The U.S. Central Intelligence Agency (CIA) claims that the Soviet Union responded by sending exorbitant funds to the FDP coalition. However, the PCI disputed this claim and, in contrast, expressed its discontent with what it perceived as a lack of support from the Soviets.

The DC coalition won the election by a comfortable margin and defeated the FDP coalition. The DC coalition went on to form a government without the leftists, who had been expelled from the government coalition in the May 1947 crises and remained frozen out.

Electoral system
The pure party-list proportional representation chosen two years before for the election of the Constituent Assembly was adopted for the Chamber of Deputies. Italian provinces were divided into 31 constituencies, each electing a group of candidates. In each constituency, seats were divided between open lists using the largest remainder method with the Imperiali quota. Remaining votes and seats transferred to the national level, where special closed lists of national leaders received the last seats using the Hare quota.

For the Senate, 237 single-seat constituencies were created. The candidates needed a two-thirds majority to be elected, but only 15 aspiring senators were elected this way. All remaining votes and seats were grouped in party lists and regional constituencies, where the D'Hondt method was used: Inside the lists, candidates with the best percentages were elected.

This electoral system became standard in Italy, and was used until 1993.

Campaign
The election remain unmatched in verbal aggression and fanaticism in Italy's period of democracy. According to the historian Gianni Corbi the 1948 election was "the most passionate, the most important, the longest, the dirtiest, and the most uncertain electoral campaign in Italian history". The election was between two competing visions of the future of Italian society. On the right, a Roman Catholic, conservative and capitalist Italy, represented by the governing Christian Democrats of De Gasperi. On the left a secular, revolutionary and socialist society, linked to the Soviet Union and represented by the FDP coalition led by the PCI.

The Christian Democrat campaign pointed to the recent communist coup in Czechoslovakia. It warned that in Communist countries, "children send parents to jail", "children are owned by the state", and told voters that disaster would strike Italy if the Communists were to take power. Another slogan was "In the secrecy of the polling booth, God sees you – Stalin doesn't."

The FDP campaign focused on living standards and avoided embarrassing questions of foreign policy, such as UN membership (vetoed by the Soviet Union) and Yugoslav control of Trieste, or losing American financial and food aid. The PCI led the FDP coalition and had effectively marginalised the PSI, which suffered loss in terms of parliamentary seats and political power. The PSI had also been hurt by the secession of a social-democratic faction led by Giuseppe Saragat, which contested the election with the concurrent list of Socialist Unity.

The PCI had difficulties in restraining its more militant members, who, in the period immediately after the war, had engaged in violent acts of reprisals. The areas affected by the violence (the so-called "Red Triangle" of Emilia, or parts of Liguria around Genoa and Savona, for instance) had previously seen episodes of brutality committed by the Fascists during Benito Mussolini's regime and the Italian Resistance during the Allied advance through Italy.

Foreign interference

The 1948 general election was greatly influenced by the Cold War that was underway between the Soviet Union and the United States. After his defeat in the election, PCI leader Palmiro Togliatti stated on 22 April that: "The elections were not free... Brutal foreign intervention was used consisting of a threat to starve the country by withholding ERP aid if it voted for the Democratic Front... The menace to use the atom bomb against towns or regions" that voted pro-communist. The U.S. government's Voice of America radio began broadcasting anti-Communist propaganda to Italy on 24 March 1948. The CIA, by its own admission, gave US$1 million (equivalent to $ in ) to what they referred to as "center parties" and was accused of publishing forged letters to discredit the leaders of the PCI. The National Security Act of 1947, that made foreign covert operations possible, had been signed into law about six months earlier by the American President Harry S. Truman.

U.S. agencies also sent ten million letters, made numerous short-wave radio broadcasts, and funded the publishing of books and articles, all of which warned Italians of the "consequences" of a communist victory. Overall, the U.S. funnelled $10 million to $20 million (equivalent to $ to $ in ) into the country for specifically anti-PCI purposes. The CIA also made use of off-the-books sources of financing to interfere in the election: millions of dollars from the Economic Cooperation Administration affiliated with the Marshall Plan and more than $10 million in captured Nazi money were steered to anti-communist propaganda. In this regard, CIA operative F. Mark Wyatt claimed: "We had bags of money that we delivered to selected politicians, to defray their political expenses, their campaign expenses, for posters, for pamphlets."

Wyatt also claimed that, in the lead up to the election, the PCI received exorbitant funds of up to $10 million per month from the Soviet Union and that Italian authorities were aware of the Soviets' activities. This was disputed by the PCI, which voiced its frustration at the Soviets' lack of support for the FDP's campaign. Italian historian Alessandro Brogi dismisses the CIA's claims as "overexaggerated" and notes that the Soviets only undertook "ad hoc last minute diplomatic [and] financial action" because it feared that inaction in Italy would set a precedent for U.S. intervention in Eastern Europe. Despite amicable meetings in the postwar years between top PCI official Pietro Secchia and Soviet leader Joseph Stalin, the Soviets were apprehensive about committing to Italy financially and only provided "occasional and modest" funds to the PCI.

The Christian Democrats eventually won the 1948 election with 48 per cent of the vote, and the FDP received 31 per cent. The CIA's practice of influencing the political situation was repeated in every Italian election for at least the next 24 years. No leftist coalition won a general election until 1996. That was partly because of Italians' traditional bent for conservatism and, even more importantly, the Cold War, with the U.S. closely watching Italy, in their determination to maintain a vital NATO presence amidst the Mediterranean and retain the Yalta-agreed status quo in western Europe.

The Irish government, motivated by the country's devout Catholicism, also interfered in the election by funnelling the modern day equivalent of €2 million through the Irish Embassy to the Vatican, which then distributed it to Catholic politicians. Joseph Walshe, Ireland's ambassador to the Vatican, had privately suggested secretly funding Azione Cattolica.

Parties and leaders

Results

Christian Democracy won a sweeping victory, taking 48.5 per cent of the vote and 305 seats in the Chamber of Deputies and 131 seats in the Senate. With an absolute majority in both chambers, DC leader and premier Alcide De Gasperi could have formed an exclusively DC government. Instead, he formed a "centrist" coalition with Liberals, Republicans and Social Democrats. De Gasperi formed three ministries during the parliamentary term, the second one in 1950 after the defection of the Liberals, who hoped for more rightist politics, and the third one in 1951 after the defection of the Social-democrats, who hoped for more leftist politics.

Following a provision of the new republican constitution, all living democratic deputies elected during the 1924 general election and deposed by the National Fascist Party in 1926, automatically became members of the first republican Senate.

Chamber of Deputies

By constituency

Senate of the Republic

By constituency

Maps

Notes

References

Further reading

  Chapter 2 Italy 1947–1948: Free elections: Hollywood style
 Brogi, Alessandro (2011). Confronting America: The Cold War Between the United States and the Communists in France and Italy, Chapel Hill: University of North Carolina Press, 
 Callanan, James (2010). Covert Action in the Cold War: US Policy, Intelligence and CIA Operations, London/New York: I.B. Tauris, 
 Del Pero, Mario. "The United States and 'psychological warfare' in Italy, 1948–1955". Journal of American History 87.4 (2001): 1304–1334.
 Luconi, Stefano. "Anticommunism, Americanization, and ethnic identity: Italian Americans and the 1948 parliamentary elections in Italy." Historian 62.2 (1999): 285–302. online
 Lundestad, Geir. "Empire by Invitation? The United States and Western Europe, 1945–1952." Journal of peace research 23.3 (1986): 263–277. 
 Miller, James E. "Taking off the gloves: The United States and the Italian elections of 1948." Diplomatic History 7.1 (1983): 35–56. Online
 Mistry, Kaeten. "The case for political warfare: Strategy, organization and US involvement in the 1948 Italian election." Cold War History 6.3 (2006): 301–329.
 Mistry, Kaeten. The United States, Italy and the origins of cold War: Waging political warfare, 1945–1950 (Cambridge UP, 2014).
 Pedaliu, Effie G. H. "The 18 April 1948 Italian election: seventy years on." LSE European Politics and Policy (EUROPP) Blog (2018) online. 
 Pedaliu, Effie G. H. "The 'British Way to Socialism': British Intervention in the Italian Election of April 1948 and its Aftermath." in Pedaliu, Britain, Italy and the Origins of the Cold War (Palgrave Macmillan, London, 2003) pp. 58–95.
 Pons, Silvio. "Stalin, Togliatti, and the origins of the cold war in Europe." Journal of Cold War Studies 3.2 (2001): 3–27. online
 Ventresca, Robert A. From Fascism to Democracy: Culture and Politics in the Italian Election of 1948, (Toronto: University of Toronto Press, 2004).

External links

 Pedaliu, Effie GH. "The 18 April 1948 Italian election: seventy years on" LSE European Politics and Policy (EUROPP) Blog (2018)

Italy
General election
General elections in Italy
Italy
Foreign electoral intervention
Election and referendum articles with incomplete results